Karl von Möller (born 11 December 1969) is an Australian cinematographer and film maker. He is best known for Not Quite Hollywood: The Wild, Untold Story of Ozploitation!, D'art and Storm Warning.

Early life
Karl von Möller was born on 11 December 1969 at Box Hill Hospital. He grew up in the leafy suburb of Donvale, Victoria in Melbourne's east and in Daylesford, Victoria. He graduated in 1988 from Whitefriars College. His mother is violinist and school teacher Ilona von Möller (née von Feuchtersleben).

Career
Karl von Möller graduated from the Swinburne Film & TV School in Melbourne. His documentary credits include "Marrying In" by Lea Bolton and "Original Schtick" for Maciej Wszelaki. von Moller shot additional material for the movies "Subterano," "The Honorable Wally Norman," and "Under the Gun." Moreover, Karl also photographed the AFI Award-winning short "Break & Enter." His first feature as the principal director of photography was the 1995 art-house picture "Freedom Deep." von Moller collaborated with director Mark Hartley on the exploitation cinema documentaries "Not Quite Hollywood: The Wild, Untold Story of Ozploitation!" and "Machete Maidens Unleashed!". He photographed the Australian component of Roger Donaldson's "The Bank Job." In addition, Karl was the cinematographer on the down under fright flicks "Storm Warning" and "Long Weekend." Outside of his feature film work, von Moller has also shot and directed many music videos and TV commercials for such clients as the Australian Defence Force, Canon, Coca-Cola and Hewlett-Packard. His first feature documentary which he directed, D'art which starred Tommy Dysart and Joan Brockenshire from the Yellow Pages commercial. It received positive reviews after a sold-out premiere.

D'art
D'art is a 2019 Australian documentary directed by von Möller. Reviews for D'art were positive after a sold-out premiere at the Classic Cinema in Elsternwick. D'art had its New South Wales Premiere at Ritz Cinema, Randwick.

The 'D'art Car' has been on tour travelling all over Australia for two years after it was launched at Lauraine Diggins Fine Art, which is a Gallery in Melbourne. The car mostly visits regional galleries over Australia in Queensland, New South Wales, Victoria and South Australia. It has had very positive reviews. It has been described by The Australian as "an act of sheer dartistry."

Later in 2020 D'art was officially selected for the Melbourne Documentary Film Festival.

Personal life
von Möller has been married to film producer and careers practitioner Bronte Howell since 1998. Their son Angelo was a youth Member of Parliament of Victoria in 2021 and 2022 and attended Preshil in Kew

von Möller can play the cello and reached AMEB Grade 6.

von Möller is the brother-in-law of Climate 200 founder Simon Holmes à Court.

Select filmography
Not Quite Hollywood: The Wild, Untold Story of Ozploitation! (2008) (documentary)
The Bank Job (2008) - Cinematographer (Australia Unit)
Long Weekend (2008)
Machete Maidens Unleashed! (2010) (documentary)
Storm Warning
D'art (2019) (documentary)

Also
In Pursuit of Honor (1995)
Time Trax (1993 - 1994)
Mission: Impossible (1988 - 1990)

Awards and nominations
Golden Phoenix Awards
2010 - Gold Phoenix Award “HP Mini”

ACS Awards (Awards for Cinematography)
2002 - GOLD Award for Music Video - Wicked Beat Sound System - 'Brand New Day
1998 - VIC GOLD Award for Advertising - 'Bonlac Western Star Butter'- 'Olympiads'
2007 - SILVER Award for Feature Cinema - Storm Warning
2005 - SILVER Award for Music Video - Anita Spring - 'Blink'
2002 - SILVER Award for Music Video - Hayley Aitken - 'I Hate The Way I Love You'
2005 - SILVER Award for Advertising - Hanafos - High Speed Internet
2005 - SILVER Award for Advertising - A.D.F - Propulsion
1999 - VIC Commended Award Kia “Kia Generations” Carnival launch
2001 - VIC Commended Award Adrian Ross “Shake a leg” Music Clip
2000 - ATV Awards Kia Mentor “learner”
2001 - ATV Awards Navy Recruiting TVC
2002 - VIC SILVER Award 'Neurosugery' Mayne Health TVC
2002 - VIC Commended Award 'Entrac' Korean GPS TVC
2004 - BelowGround music Video Festival Best Independent Music Video for Space Like Alice "SignLanguage"
2005 - VIC SILVER Award ‘Stay a little longer’ Anita Springs music video
2006 - VIC Commended AWARD ‘Forged’ short film
2006 - VIC Commended Award JOGGER’ TVC Army Reserve

References

External links

 Review: 'D'art'

Australian cinematographers
1969 births
Living people
Australian people of Nigerian descent
Von Harteneck Family
Von Möller Family
Von Feuchtersleben Family
People from Donvale, Victoria
Film directors from Melbourne
Australian people of German descent